Joanne Woods (born November 7, 1959 in Edmonton, Alberta) is a Canadian slalom canoer who competed from the mid-1980s to the mid-1990s. She finished eighth in the K-1 event at the 1992 Summer Olympics in Barcelona.

References
 Sports-Reference.com profile

1959 births
Canadian female canoeists
Canoeists at the 1992 Summer Olympics
Living people
Olympic canoeists of Canada
Sportspeople from Edmonton